Emmanuel Baptist Church may refer to:

 Emmanuel Baptist Church (Alexandria, Louisiana), listed on the NRHP
 Emmanuel Baptist (Worcester, Massachusetts), listed on the NRHP
 Emmanuel Baptist Church (Brooklyn, New York), listed on the NRHP
 Emmanuel Baptist Church (Yangon, Myanmar)
 Emmanuel Baptist Church (Belleville, Ontario)
 Emmanuel Baptist Church, in San Francisco, California, the site of 2 murders by Theodore Durrant in the late 19th century